The 1939 National Challenge Cup was the annual open cup held by the United States Football Association now known as the Lamar Hunt U.S. Open Cup.

Eastern Division

Western Division

a) aggregate after 3 games

Final

First game

Second game

Nat
U.S. Open Cup